Seagoe parish or St Gobhan's parish is an ecclesiastical parish of the Church of Ireland that is located in Portadown, County Armagh, Northern Ireland. It is on one of the oldest recorded sites of Christianity in Ireland. Christian links to the area date back to the early 500 AD's. It was founded by St. Gobhan.

The current rector is Terence Cadden, having been installed in 2006. The current rector's predecessor is David Chillingworth, Primus of the Scottish Episcopal Church. Another previous rector was Jack Shearer, who later became the Dean of Belfast.

Parish Centre
In 2010 the parish centre was opened by the previous rector David Chillingworth. The building cost £1.5 million. It contains a series of multi-functional rooms and classrooms, a main hall and a rotunda with a meeting area, coffee bar and circular prayer/quiet room.

Organisations
The current organisations that form part of the parish ministry are the following:
Seagoe Youth Group
Sunday School
Youth Fellowship
Church Lads’ Brigade
Church Girls' Brigade
Junior Youth Club
Senior Youth Club
St. Patrick’s Youth Club
After School activity Club
Mothers’ Union
Prayer Meeting
Alpha Course
Forward Focus Development Group
Healing Prayer Group
Choir
Music group

Seagoe Primary School
The parish is linked to Seagoe Primary School, having established the school. The link is reflected in the school ethos.

References

Church of Ireland parishes in Northern Ireland
Churches in County Armagh
Gothic Revival church buildings in Northern Ireland